Willard Jehu Smith [Red] (April 11, 1892 – July 17, 1970) was an American catcher in Major League Baseball who played over parts of two seasons with the Pittsburgh Pirates.  For his career, he compiled a .156 batting average (7-for-45) in 26 game appearances.

Smith was born in Logansport, Indiana and died in Bradenton, Florida at the age of 78.

External links
, or Retrosheet

1892 births
1970 deaths
Baseball players from Indiana
Birmingham Barons players
Cairo Egyptians players
Denver Bears players
Hopkinsville Hoppers players
Major League Baseball catchers
Nashville Vols players
People from Logansport, Indiana
Pittsburgh Pirates players
Quincy Indians players
Quincy Red Birds players
Toledo Mud Hens players